Mallo may refer to:

 Mallo Cup, candy produced by Boyer Brothers 
 Assan Jana Mall-o Mall, 2002 pop album by Pakistani singer Abrar-ul-Haq
 The name of the main character in the Nintendo 3DS game Pushmo
 Hugo Mallo
 Mallo, a social network for deals.

See also
 Mallos (disambiguation) 
 Malo (disambiguation)
 Malloa, Chilean commune and town in Cachapoal Province, O'Higgins Region
 Mallow (disambiguation)
 Malloy, surname